Liga Deportiva Universitaria de Quito's 1993 season was the club's 63rd year of existence, the 40th year in professional football, and the 33rd in the top level of professional football in Ecuador.

Kits
Supplier: DideSponsor(s): Orangine, Casa Cobo

Squad

Competitions

Serie A

First stage

Results

Second stage

Results

Liguilla Final

Results

External links

RSSSF - 1993 Serie A 

1993